The Walled Off Hotel is a boutique hotel designed by anonymous London-based artist Banksy alongside other creatives. It is located in Bethlehem,  from Ben Gurion Airport. Established in March 2017, and initially set out to only be a temporary exhibition, the hotel has since attracted nearly 140,000 visitors, thanks in part to its location opposite the portion of the Israeli West Bank Barrier separating Bethlehem from the holy site of Rachel's Tomb. The hotel is considered to be a key piece of social commentary on the Palestinians affected by the Israeli-Palestine Conflict and billed as having "the worst view of any hotel in the world".

History 
Established on 3 March 2017, the hotel is generally considered to be a follow-up to Banksy's 2015 Dismaland project, held for five weeks in Weston-Super-Mare in the South-West of England, making a commentary on life in coastal towns in 21st-century Britain.

Critical reception 
The reaction to the hotel as a work of art and social intervention has been mixed, especially given its location and subject matter. Critics have argued that such a building profits off tragedy, and is a case of war tourism. Nonetheless, evidence has suggested that the hotel has brought more tourism to areas of the West Bank, in turn raising awareness of the realities of the Palestinians affected by the conflict.

Critics have described some art works as antisemitic and have denounced the Holocaust imagery in several displays: "including a scale whereby one Jewish tooth outweighs hundreds of Palestinian teeth; a glass case containing clothing and shoes of Palestinian children. The painting of Jesus Christ with a sniper’s red dot sight on his head is perceived by critics as an antisemitic libel of Jewish deicide.

Gallery

See also

References

External links 

 

Works by Banksy
Buildings and structures in Bethlehem
Hotels in the State of Palestine
Hotels established in 2017
Israeli West Bank barrier